Splendor is a 1999 romantic comedy film directed by Gregg Araki and starring Kathleen Robertson, Johnathon Schaech, and Matt Keeslar. The film deals with an open relationship between the three leads.

Plot
When struggling Los Angeles actress Veronica finds herself simultaneously falling in love with a sensitive writer named Abel and an air-headed drummer named Zed, she initially tries to see them both without the other finding out, and then to choose between them. When she is unable to do so, she begins openly dating them both, and the three eventually move in together, forming a unique yet functional group relationship. Veronica's friend Mike is critical of their relationship, though she warms to the concept over time. Abel and Zed are initially antagonistic to one another but grow closer over time, eventually becoming closer to one another than either of them are to Veronica. When Veronica becomes pregnant, the relationship becomes strained and she eventually leaves both Abel and Zed for charming director Ernest, whom she agrees to marry despite not loving. At the film's climax, Abel and Zed race across the city at Mike's urging to stop the wedding and win her back.

Cast
 Kathleen Robertson as Veronica
 Johnathon Schaech as Abel
 Matt Keeslar as Zed
 Kelly Macdonald as Mike
 Eric Mabius as Ernest
 Dan Gatto as Mutt
 Linda Kim as Alison
 Audrey Ruttan as The Gloved One
 Amy Stevens as Nana Kitty Cat
 Adam Carola as Mike's stupid boss
 Mink Stole as Casting director

Themes
Speaking to Filmmaker Magazine, Araki referred to the film as being "very much about trying to live by your own rules...about achieving conventional happiness in an unconventional way." In terms of genre, he said "I wanted a sort of Cary Grant stylization. As in screwball comedy, the emotions are real, but there is also a kind of sheen to the performance."

Reception
Splendor received mixed reviews from critics. It holds a ranking of 52/100 on review aggregator Metacritic, and has a 58% on Rotten Tomatoes. The Chicago Reader described it as being "marvelously neutral toward a type of sexual and domestic relationship that's often exploited or overblown", and The Austin Chronicle stated that "there's a genuine, sparky chemistry between the three...and Robertson, particularly, is luminous in her role." The Daily News was less positive, saying that the film "seems more like a vapid sitcom made on a low budget" and summarising it as "meaningless, if perverted, fun." Variety stated that, "though less violent and macabre than all of (Araki's) previous movies, Splendor is not exactly fresh, nor a radical point of departure...a seductively sensual picture that entices while it lasts but evaporates like an air bubble as soon as it is over."

See also
 Design for Living, the acclaimed 1933 film with an identical premise.

References

External links
 

1999 films
1999 romantic comedy films
1999 LGBT-related films
British LGBT-related films
British romantic comedy films
American LGBT-related films
American romantic comedy films
1990s English-language films
Films directed by Gregg Araki
Bisexuality-related films
Films about threesomes
Films set in Los Angeles
Films shot in Los Angeles
American independent films
Lesbian-related films
Summit Entertainment films
Films produced by Graham Broadbent
The Samuel Goldwyn Company films
Films scored by Daniel Licht
1999 independent films
1990s American films
1990s British films